Jalan Batu Tiga Lama, which consists of Jalan Sungai Rasau and Persiaran Selangor, also called Federal Route 3216 (formerly Selangor state route B6), is an industrial federal road in Klang Valley regions, Selangor, Malaysia. It is a toll free road.

The Kilometre Zero is located at Klang.

At most sections, the Federal Route 3216 was built under the JKR U4 road standard, allowing maximum speed limit of up to 60 km/h.

List of junctions

References

Malaysian Federal Roads